An octane rating, or octane number, is a standard measure of a fuel's ability to withstand compression in an internal combustion engine without detonating. The higher the octane number, the more compression the fuel can withstand before detonating. Octane rating does not relate directly to the power output or the energy content of the fuel per unit mass or volume, but simply indicates gasoline's capability against compression.

Whether or not a higher octane fuel improves or impairs an engine's performance depends on the design of the engine. In broad terms, fuels with a higher octane rating are used in higher-compression gasoline engines, which may yield higher power for these engines. Such higher power comes from the fuel's higher compression by the engine design, and not directly from the gasoline.

In contrast, fuels with lower octane (but higher cetane numbers) are ideal for diesel engines because diesel engines (also called compression-ignition engines) do not compress the fuel, but rather compress only air and then inject fuel into the air that was heated by compression. Gasoline engines rely on ignition of air and fuel compressed together as a mixture, which is ignited near the end of the compression stroke by electric spark plugs. Therefore, high compressibility of the fuel matters mainly for gasoline engines. Using gasoline with lower octane may cause engine knocking (pre-ignition).

The octane rating of aviation gasoline was extremely important in determining aero engine performance in the aircraft of World War II. The octane rating alone did not only determine the performance of the gasoline, but also the versatility of the fuel in handling a range of lean to rich operating conditions.

Principles

The problem: pre-ignition and knocking

In a typical Otto cycle spark-ignition engine, the air-fuel mixture is heated as a result of being compressed and is then ignited by the spark plug.  This burning normally takes place via rapid propagation of a flame front through the mixture, but if the unburnt portion of the fuel in the combustion chamber is heated (or compressed) too much, pockets of unburnt fuel may self-ignite (detonate) before the main flame front reaches them. Shockwaves produced by detonation can cause much higher pressures than engine components are designed for, and can cause a "knocking" or "pinging" sound. Knocking can cause major engine damage if severe.

Most engine management systems commonly found in automobiles today (typically EFI-Electronic Fuel Injection) have a knock sensor that monitors if knock is being produced by the fuel being used. In modern computer-controlled engines, the ignition timing will be automatically altered by the engine management system to reduce the knock to an acceptable level.

Iso-octane as a reference standard

Octanes are a family of hydrocarbons that are typical components of gasoline. They are colorless liquids that boil around 125 °C (260 °F). One member of the octane family, iso-octane, is used as a reference standard to benchmark the tendency of gasoline or LPG fuels to resist self-ignition.

The octane rating of gasoline is measured in a test engine and is defined by comparison with the mixture of 2,2,4-trimethylpentane (iso-octane) and normal heptane that would have the same anti-knocking capability as the fuel under test. The percentage, by volume, of 2,2,4-trimethylpentane in that mixture is the octane number of the fuel.  For example, gasoline with the same knocking characteristics as a mixture of 90% iso-octane and 10% heptane would have an octane rating of 90. A rating of 90 does not mean that the gasoline contains just iso-octane and heptane in these proportions, but that it has the same detonation resistance properties (generally, gasoline sold for common use never consists solely of iso-octane and heptane; it is a mixture of many hydrocarbons and often other additives).

Octane ratings are not indicators of the energy content of fuels. (See Effects below and Heat of combustion). They are only a measure of the fuel's tendency to burn in a controlled manner, rather than exploding in an uncontrolled manner. 
This is important to know when choosing a fuel for a particular engine. Performance is optimized when the lowest octane rated fuel that can be used without detonation is used.

Where the octane number is raised by blending in ethanol, energy content per volume is reduced. Ethanol energy density can be compared with gasoline in heat-of-combustion tables.

It is possible for a fuel to have a Research Octane Number (RON) more than 100, because iso-octane is not the most knock-resistant substance available today.  Racing fuels, avgas, LPG and alcohol fuels such as methanol may have octane ratings of 110 or significantly higher. Typical "octane booster" gasoline additives include MTBE, ETBE, isooctane and toluene. Lead in the form of tetraethyllead was once a common additive, but concerns about its toxicity have lead to its use for fuels for road vehicles being progressively phased out worldwide beginning in the 1970s.

Measurement methods

Research Octane Number (RON)
The most common type of octane rating worldwide is the Research Octane Number (RON).  RON is determined by running the fuel in a test engine with a variable compression ratio under controlled conditions, and comparing the results with those for mixtures of iso-octane and n-heptane. The compression ratio is varied during the test to challenge the fuel's antiknocking tendency, as an increase in the compression ratio will increase the chances of knocking.

Motor Octane Number (MON)
Another type of octane rating, called Motor Octane Number (MON), is determined at 900 rpm engine speed instead of the 600 rpm for RON.  MON testing uses a similar test engine to that used in RON testing, but with a preheated fuel mixture, higher engine speed, and variable ignition timing to further stress the fuel's knock resistance.  Depending on the composition of the fuel, the MON of a modern pump gasoline will be about 8 to 12 lower than the RON, but there is no direct link between RON and MON.

Anti-Knock Index (AKI) or (R+M)/2
In most countries in Europe (also in Australia, Pakistan and New Zealand) the "headline" octane rating shown on the pump is the RON, but in Canada, the United States, and Mexico, the headline number is the simple mean or average of the RON and the MON, called the Anti-Knock Index (AKI), and often written on pumps as (R+M)/2.

Difference between RON, MON, and AKI
Because of the 8 to 12 octane number difference between RON and MON noted above, the AKI shown in Canada and the United States is 4 to 6 octane numbers lower than elsewhere in the world for the same fuel.  This difference between RON and MON is known as the fuel's sensitivity, and is not typically published for those countries that use the Anti-Knock Index labelling system.

See the table in the following section for a comparison.

Observed Road Octane Number (RdON)
Another type of octane rating, called Observed Road Octane Number (RdON), is derived from testing gasolines in real world multi-cylinder engines, normally at wide open throttle. It was developed in the 1920s and is still reliable today. The original testing was done in cars on the road but as technology developed the testing was moved to chassis dynamometers with environmental controls to improve consistency.

Octane Index
The evaluation of the octane number by the two laboratory methods requires a standard engine, and the test procedure can be both expensive and time-consuming.  The standard engine required for the test may not always be available, especially in out-of-the-way places or in small or mobile laboratories. These and other considerations led to the search for a rapid method for the evaluation of the anti-knock quality of gasoline. Such methods include FTIR, near infrared on-line analyzers and others. Deriving an equation that can be used for calculating the octane quality would also serve the same purpose with added advantages. The term Octane Index is often used to refer to the calculated octane quality in contradistinction to the (measured) research or motor octane numbers. The octane index can be of great service in the blending of gasoline. Motor gasoline, as marketed, is usually a blend of several types of refinery grades that are derived from different processes such as straight-run gasoline, reformate, cracked gasoline etc. These different grades are considered as one group when blending to meet final product specifications. Most refiners produce and market more than one grade of motor gasoline, differing principally in their anti-knock quality. The ability to predict the octane quality of the blends prior to blending is essential, something for which the calculated octane index is specially suited.

Aviation gasoline octane ratings
Aviation gasolines used in piston aircraft engines common in general aviation have a slightly different method of measuring the octane of the fuel.  Similar to an AKI, it has two different ratings, although it is usually referred to only by the lower of the two. One is referred to as the "aviation lean" rating and is the same as the MON of the fuel up to 100.  The second is the "aviation rich" rating and corresponds to the octane rating of a test engine under forced induction operation common in high-performance and military piston aircraft.  This utilizes a supercharger, and uses a significantly richer fuel/air ratio for improved detonation resistance. 

The most commonly used current fuel, 100LL, has an aviation lean rating of 100 octane, and an aviation rich rating of 130.

Examples

The RON/MON values of n-heptane and iso-octane are exactly 0 and 100, respectively, by the definition of octane rating. The following table lists octane ratings for various other fuels.

Effects

Higher octane ratings correlate to higher activation energies: the amount of applied energy required to initiate combustion. Since higher octane fuels have higher activation energy requirements, it is less likely that a given compression will cause uncontrolled ignition, otherwise known as autoignition, selfignition, pre-ignition, detonation, or knocking.

Because octane is a measured and/or calculated rating of the fuel's ability to resist autoignition, the higher the octane of the fuel, the harder that fuel is to ignite and the more heat is required to ignite it. The result is that a hotter ignition spark is required for ignition. Creating a hotter spark requires more energy from the ignition system, which in turn increases the parasitic electrical load on the engine. The spark also must begin earlier in order to generate sufficient heat at the proper time for precise ignition. As octane, ignition spark energy, and the need for precise timing increase, the engine becomes more difficult to "tune" and keep "in tune". The resulting sub-optimal spark energy and timing can cause major engine problems, from a simple "miss" to uncontrolled detonation and catastrophic engine failure.

The other rarely-discussed reality with high-octane fuels associated with "high performance" is that as octane increases, the specific gravity and energy content of the fuel per unit of weight are reduced. The net result is that to make a given amount of power, more high-octane fuel must be burned in the engine. Lighter and "thinner" fuel also has a lower specific heat, so the practice of running an engine "rich" to use excess fuel to aid in cooling requires richer and richer mixtures as octane increases.

Higher-octane, lower-energy-dense "thinner" fuels often contain alcohol compounds incompatible with the stock fuel system components, which also makes them hygroscopic. They also evaporate away much more easily than heavier, lower-octane fuel which leads to more accumulated contaminants in the fuel system.

During the compression stroke of an internal combustion engine, the temperature of the air-fuel mix rises as it is compressed, in accordance with the ideal gas law. Higher compression ratios necessarily add parasitic load to the engine, and are only necessary if the engine is being specifically designed to run on high-octane fuel. Aircraft engines run at relatively low speeds and are "undersquare". They run best on lower-octane, slower-burning fuels that require less heat and a lower compression ratio for optimum vaporization and uniform fuel-air mixing, with the ignition spark coming as late as possible in order to extend the production of cylinder pressure and torque as far down the power stroke as possible. The main reason for using high-octane fuel in air-cooled engines is that it is more easily vaporized in a cold carburetor and engine and absorbs less intake air heat which greatly reduces the tendency for carburetor icing to occur.

With their reduced densities and weight per volume of fuel, the other obvious benefit is that an aircraft with any given volume of fuel in the tanks is automatically lighter. And since many airplanes are flown only occasionally and may sit unused for weeks or months, the lighter fuels tend to evaporate away and leave behind fewer deposits such as "varnish" (gasoline components, particularly alkenes and oxygenates slowly polymerize into solids).  Aircraft also typically have dual "redundant" ignition systems which are nearly impossible to tune and time to produce identical ignition timing, so using a lighter fuel that's less prone to autoignition is a wise "insurance policy". For the same reasons, those lighter fuels which are better solvents are much less likely to cause any "varnish" or other fouling on the "backup" spark plugs.

In almost all general aviation piston engines, the fuel mixture is directly controlled by the pilot, via a knob and cable or lever similar to (and next to) the throttle control. Leaning — reducing the mixture from its maximum amount — must be done with knowledge, as some combinations of fuel mixture and throttle position (that produce the highest ) can cause detonation and/or pre-ignition, in the worst case destroying the engine within seconds. Pilots are taught in primary training to avoid settings that produce the highest exhaust gas temperatures, and run the engine either "rich of peak EGT" (more fuel than can be burned with the available air) or "lean of peak" (less fuel, leaving some oxygen in the exhaust) as either will keep the fuel-air mixture from detonating prematurely. Because of the high cost of unleaded, high-octane avgas, and possible increased range before refueling, some general aviation pilots attempt to save money by tuning their fuel-air mixtures and ignition timing to run "lean of peak". Additionally, the decreased air density at higher altitudes (such as Colorado) and temperatures (as in summer) requires leaning (reduction in amount of fuel per volume or mass of air) for the peak EGT and power (crucial for takeoff).

Regional variations
The selection of octane ratings available at filling stations can vary greatly between countries.
 Australia: "regular" unleaded fuel is 91 RON, "premium" unleaded with 95 RON is widely available, and 98 RON fuel is also very common. Shell used to sell 100 RON fuel (5% ethanol content) from a small number of service stations, most of which are located in major cities (stopped in August 2008). United Petroleum used to sell 100 RON unleaded fuel (10% ethanol content) at a small number of its service stations (originally only two, but then expanded to 67 outlets nationwide) (stopped in September 2014). All fuel in Australia is unleaded except for some aviation fuels. E85 unleaded fuel is also available at several United service stations across the country. Recently E10 fuel has become quite common, and is available at almost every major fuel station, except in Western Australia.
 Bahrain: 91 and 95 (RON), standard in all gasoline stations in the country and advertised as (Jayyid) for Regular or 91 and (Mumtaz) for Premium or 95 and 98 (RON) as super.
 Bangladesh: Two types of fuel are available at petrol stations in Bangladesh. Motor Gasoline Regular (marketed as "Petrol") which has RON 80 rating, and Motor Gasoline Premium (marketed as "Octane") which has RON 95 rating. Petrol stations in Bangladesh are privatised, but the prices are regulated by the authorities and have a fixed price at BDT 86.00 (US$1.04) and BDT 89.00 (US$1.07) (as of 1 March 2018) per litre respectively.
 Botswana: 93 and 95 RON are standard at almost all gas stations thorough Botswana. The two types are unleaded.
 Brazil: As defined by federal law, the RON standard is used and all types of gasoline sold in all gas stations throughout the country are unleaded (the latter since 1991). By default, it was defined by the federal government that the regular (and the lowest) octane standard in Brazil is 92 RON, known in Portuguese as Gasolina Comum (English: "Common Gasoline") - Petrobras stations brand it as Gasolina Regular (English: "Regular Gasoline"). This type of gasoline can be found in most Brazilian petrol stations and does not have any additives, except the inclusion of 27% of ethanol (as required by the Brazilian National Agency of Petroleum, Natural Gas and Biofuels - Portuguese: Agência Nacional do Petróleo, Gás Natural e Biocombustíveis or simply ANP - since 2011). Along with the "Common" gasoline, there is a second type of gasoline that can also be found in most stations in Brazil. This gasoline is also mixed with 27% of ethanol (to comply with the ANP regulation, that prohibits the sale of the 100% "pure gasoline" compound in all Brazilian stations), but a few detergent and dispersant additives are also included in the compound. This type of gasoline is known in Portuguese as Gasolina Aditivada (English: "Additived Gasoline") - Petrobras stations brand it as "Petrobras Grid"; nevertheless, the octane rating is also 92 RON (these additives are used to improve the performance and efficiency of the engine, but they are not indicative of a higher octane rating). However, higher octane levels of gasoline are found in many stations (all stations in Brazil, regardless of the octane rating, have to conform the ANP requirement of 27% of ethanol mixed with the gasoline, and both "Common" and "Additived" gasolines can also be found in most of these stations), such as the "Premium Gasoline" (known in Portuguese as Gasolina Premium - 97 RON), the "OctaPro" (103 RON), sold at Ipiranga stations, and the "Petrobras Podium" (97 RON), sold at Petrobras stations.
 Canada: in Canada octane rating is displayed in AKI. In most areas, the standard grades are 87 (regular), 89 (mid-grade) and 91-94 (premium) AKI. In the Atlantic Provinces, gasoline is often available without any blend of ethanol, but only up to 91 AKI.
 China: 92 and 95 (RON) (previously 93 and 97) are commonly offered. In limited areas higher rating such as 98 RON is available. In some rural areas it can be difficult to find fuel with over 92 RON.
 Chile: 93, 95 and 97 RON are standard at almost all gas stations thorough Chile. The three types are unleaded.
 Colombia: "Ecopetrol", Colombia's monopoly of refining and distribution of gasoline establishes a minimum AKI of 81 octanes for "Corriente" gasoline and minimum AKI of 87 octanes for "Extra" gasoline. (91.5 RON corriente, and 91 RON for extra)
 Costa Rica: RECOPE, Costa Rica's distribution monopoly, establishes the following ratings: Plus 91 (at least 91 RON) and Super (at least 95 RON).
 Croatia: All fuel stations offer unleaded "Eurosuper BS" (abbreviation "BS" meaning "no sulfur content") 95 RON fuel, many also offer "Eurosuper Plus BS" 98 RON. Some companies offer 100 RON fuel instead of 98.
 Cyprus: All fuel stations offer unleaded 95 and 98 RON, and a few offer 100 RON as well.
 Denmark: 95 RON is a common budget choice, with 95 and 98 being widely available, and 92 rarely seen as it has been phased out during the 2010s. A selection of brands offers >=100 options, under trademarked names. However several fuel stations are phasing out 92 RON. By law, it is decided that all gasoline companies from July 2010 to January 2020 should use a mix containing 5% bioethanol in the gasoline and increased to 10% after January 2020.
 Ecuador: "Extra" with 87 and "Super" with 92 (RON) are available in all fuel stations. "Extra" is the most commonly used. All fuels are unleaded.
 Egypt: Egyptian fuel stations had 90 RON until July 2014 when the government found no remaining use for it, leaving only 92 RON and 95 RON. 80 RON is found in a very limited number of fuel stations as they are used only for extremely old cars that cannot cope with high octane fuel. 95 RON was used limitedly due to its high price (more than twice the price of 92 RON). But after the increasing the prices again in 2018, 95 RON price became only 15% higher than 92 RON, so it started to gain popularity.
 Estonia: 95 RON and 98 RON are widely available.
 Finland: 95 and 98 (RON), advertised as such, at almost all gas stations. Most cars run on 95, but 98 is available for vehicles that need higher octane fuel, or older models containing parts easily damaged by high ethanol content. Shell offers V-Power, advertised as "over 99 octane", instead of 98. In the beginning of 2011 95 RON was replaced by 95E10 containing 10% ethanol, and 98 RON by 98E5, containing 5% ethanol. ST1 also offers RE85 on some stations, which is 85% ethanol made from biodegradable waste (from which the advertised name "ReFuel" comes). RE85 is only suitable for flexifuel cars that can run on high-percentage ethanol.
 Germany: "Super E5 and E10" 95 RON and "Super Plus E5" 98 RON are available practically everywhere. Big suppliers such as Shell or Aral offer 100 RON gasoline (Shell V-Power, Aral Ultimate) at almost every fuel station. "Normal" 91 RON is only rarely offered because lower production amounts make it more expensive than "Super" 95 RON. Due to a new European Union law, gas stations are being required to offer a minimum rate of the new mixture of "Super" 95 RON with up to 10% Ethanol branded as "Super E10". 
 Greece (Hellas): 95 RON (standard unleaded), 98 & 100 RON unleaded offered by some companies (e.g. EKO, Shell, BP).

 Hong Kong: only 98 RON is available in the market. There have been calls to re-introduce 95 RON, but the calls have been rejected by all automotive fuel station chains, citing that 95 RON was phased out because of market forces.
 India: India's ordinary and premium petrol options are of 91 RON. The premium petrols are generally ordinary fuels with additives, that do not really change the octane value. Two variants, "Speed 93" and "Speed 97", were launched, with RON values of 93 and 97. Recently, Hindustan Petroleum launched poWer 99 with an RON value of 99 which is currently available only in Bangalore, Pune and now in Mumbai but expected to roll out in other major cities soon. India's economy-class vehicles usually have compression ratios under 10:1, thus enabling them to use lower-octane petrol without engine knocking.
 Indonesia: Indonesia's "Premium" gasoline, rated at 88 RON, was the lowest grade gasoline, but was phased out by 2021. Other options have been "Pertalite", rated at 90 RON; "Pertamax", rated at 92 RON; "Pertamax Plus", rated at 95 RON (now discontinued); and "Pertamax Racing", a 100 RON fuel sold in selected stations. From August 2016, Pertamina began selling "Pertamax Turbo", rated at 98 RON, as a replacement for Pertamax Plus. Total and Shell stations only sell RON 92 and 95 gasoline. Shell launched a new variant, "Regular", rated at 90 RON, in early 2018, but this was discontinued in January 2022.
 Iran: 'regular' gasoline has an octane rating of 87 RON, which is the most prevalent type of gasoline available throughout the country. Select gas stations within major cities also offer 'Super' 95 RON. Due to high air pollution, an environmentally cleaner variety, marketed as Euro-4, is being introduced in metropolitan areas instead of the Regular, which boasts an octane rating of 91 RON and sulphur levels not exceeding 50 ppm. 
 Ireland: 95 RON "unleaded" is the only gasoline type available through stations, although E5 (99 RON) is becoming more commonplace.
 Italy: 95 RON is the only compulsory gasoline offered (verde, "green"), only a few fuel stations (Agip, IP, IES, OMV) offer 98 RON as the premium type, many Shell and Tamoil stations close to the cities offer also V-Power Gasoline rated at 100 RON. Recently Agip introduced "Blu Super+", a 100 RON gasoline.
 Israel: 95 RON & 98 RON are normally available at most automotive fuel stations. 96 RON is also available at a large number of gas stations but 95 RON is more preferred because it's cheaper and performance differences aren't very wide and noticeable. "Regular" fuel is 95 RON. All variants are unleaded.
 Japan: Since 1986, "regular" is >=89 RON, and "high octane" is >=96 RON, lead free. Those values are defined in standard JIS K 2202. Sometimes "high octane" is sold under different names, such as "F-1".
 Latvia: 95 RON and 98 RON widely available.
 Lebanon: 95 RON and 98 RON are widely available.
 Lithuania: 95 RON and 98 RON widely available. In some gas stations E85 (bioethanol) gasoline, 98E15 (15% of ethanol), 98E25 (25% of ethanol) are available.
 Malaysia: 95 RON, 97 RON and 100 RON. "Regular" unleaded fuel is 95 RON; "Premium" fuel is rated at 97 RON (Shell's V-Power Racing is rated minimum 97 RON). Petron sells 100 RON in selected outlets.
 Mexico: The standard octane index is 87 AKI for regular fuel and anywhere from 91 to 93 AKI for premium fuel, although 91 AKI is the most common octane number for premium fuel. Valero is the only station offering 93 AKI fuel in Mexico, at a premium of 5% to 10% over standard 91 AKI fuel. Valero stations are usually present in main cities, such as Monterrey, Guadalajara, Querétaro and Puebla.  From 1938 to 2018, Mexican government held a monopoly in the distribution of fuel, and its brands for unleaded fuel were "Pemex Magna" and "Pemex Premium", appearing in the early 1990s, before that, fuel was usually leaded. Mexican regulations do not enforce any particular labels to identify different grades of fuel as long as each grade is clearly labeled with distinct names and colors, but the long history of Pemex's colors has established a tradition of labeling regular fuel with green, premium fuel with red, and diesel with black. Gas station brands that use different colors include Shell, BP, Mobil and Akron.
 Mongolia: 92 RON and 95 RON (advertised as A92 and A95 respectively) are available at nearly all stations while slightly fewer stations offer 80 RON (advertised as A80). 98 RON (advertised as A98) is available in select few stations.
 Montenegro: 95 RON is sold as a "regular" fuel. As a "premium" fuel, 98 RON is sold. Both variants are unleaded.
 Myanmar: Most petrol stations carry 92 RON as standard especially in rural areas. Most larger cities and highway stations have introduced 95 RON in the past few years. The highest grade available is 97 RON which is only sold by a few stations in Yangon and Nay Pyi Taw (e.g., PTT, MMTM, Petrotrans).
 Netherlands: 95 RON "Euro" is sold at every station, whereas 98 RON "Super Plus" is being phased out in favor of "premium" fuels, which are all 95 RON fuels with extra additives. Shell V-Power is a 97 RON (labelled as 95 due to the legalities of only using 95 or 98 labelling), some independent tests have shown that one year after introduction it was downgraded to 95 RON, whereas in neighboring Germany Shell V-Power consists of the regular 100 RON fuel.
 New Zealand: 91 RON "Regular" and 95 RON "Premium" are both widely available. 98 RON is available instead of 95 RON at some (BP, Mobil, Gull) service stations in larger urban areas (newer BP stations also offer 95 by blending 91 and 98 where 98 is available). 100 RON is available at selected NPD service stations in the South Island and in very limited locations in the North Island.
 Norway: 95 RON are widely available, but 98 RON is also available at Shell; it is 10-20% more expensive as 95 RON fuel. Statoil has discontinued production and sale due to low demand.
 Pakistan: 3 types of fuel available. 92, HOBC 95 & HOBC 97 RON. Super marketed as 92 RON, 95 RON marketed by Shell as V-Power and 97 RON by Total Parco Pakistan & Pakistan State Oil (PSO).  HOBC pricing was deregulated in October, 2016.
 Philippines: A brand of Petron, Petron Blaze is rated at 100 RON (the only brand of gasoline in the Philippines without an ethanol blend). Other "super premium" brands like Petron XCS, Caltex Gold, Shell V-Power are rated at 95-97 RON, while Petron Xtra Unleaded, Caltex Silver, and Shell Super Unleaded are rated at 93 RON.
 Poland: Eurosuper 95 (RON 95) is sold in every gas station. Super Plus 98 (RON 98) is available in most stations, sometimes under brand (Orlen - Verva, BP - Ultimate, Shell - V-Power) and usually containing additives. Shell offers V-Power Racing fuel which is rated RON 100.
 Portugal: 95 RON "Euro" is sold in every station and 98 RON "Super" being offered in almost every station.
 Russia and CIS countries: 92 RON is the minimum available, the standard is  95 RON is sold in every gas station. 98 RON  is available in most stations. As a "premium" fuel, 100 RON is sold, Gazpromneft and Lukoil both variants are unleaded.
 Saudi Arabia: Two types of fuel are available at all petrol stations in Saudi Arabia. "Premium 91" (RON 91) has green pumps, and "Super Premium 95" (RON 95) where the pumps are red. Fuel dyes are used to make the colour of the fuel match that of the pump. While petrol stations in Saudi Arabia are privatised, the prices are regulated by the authorities and have a fixed at SR 1.44 (US$0.38) and SR 2.10 (US$0.56) (as of 14 April 2019) per litre respectively; and is currently being increased at a quarterly rate to bring it up to the worldwide average by 2020. Prior to 2006, only Super Premium RON 95 was available and the pumps weren't coloured in any specific order. The public didn't know what Octane rating was, therefore big educating campaigns were spread, telling the people to use the "red petrol" only for high end cars, and save money on using the "green petrol" for regular cars and trucks.
 Singapore: All four providers, Caltex, ExxonMobil, SPC and Shell have 3 grades of gasoline. Typically, these are 92, 95, and 98 RON. However, since 2009, Shell has removed 92 RON.
 South Africa: "regular" unleaded fuel is 95 RON in coastal areas. Inland (higher elevation) "regular" unleaded fuel is 93 RON; once again most fuel stations optionally offer 95 RON.
 South Korea: "regular" unleaded fuel is 91~94 RON, "premium" is 95+ RON nationally. However, not all gas stations carry "premium."
 Spain: 95 RON "Euro" is sold in every station with 98 RON "Super" being offered in most stations. Many stations around cities and highways offer other high-octane "premium" brands.
 Sri Lanka: Sri Lanka switched their regular gasoline from 90 RON to 92 RON on January 1, 2014. In Ceypetco filling stations, 92 RON is the regular automotive fuel and 95 RON is called 'Super Petrol', which comes at a premium price. In LIOC filling stations, 92 RON is the regular automotive fuel and 95 RON is available as 'Premium Petrol'. As of 2022, LIOC fillings stations offer a new fuel labelled as 'XtraPremium' Petrol which is marketed as 'Euro 3' standard petrol. Similarly 95 RON petrol is now offered as 'XtraPremium' 95 Petrol.
 Sweden: 95 RON, 98 RON and E85 are widely available.
 Taiwan: 92 RON, 95 RON and 98 RON are widely available at gas stations in Taiwan.
 Thailand: 95 RON is widely available. 91 RON automotive fuel was withdrawn on January 1, 2013, to increase uptake of gasohol fuels.
 Trinidad and Tobago: 92 RON (Super) and 95 RON (Premium) are widely available.
 Turkey: 95 RON and 95+ RON widely available in gas stations. 91 RON (Regular) has been dropped in 2006. 98 and 100 RON (Shell V-Power Racing) has been dropped in late 2009. The Gas which has been advertised 97 RON has been dropped in 2014 and renamed 95+.
 Ukraine: 80 RON and 98 RON gasoline is available. The standard gasoline is 95 RON, but 92 RON gasoline is also widely available and popular for older cars. There is no government regulation for gasoline with RON higher than 98 so some stations are marketing 100 RON gasoline when in reality this can be anything above 98 RON with extra cleaning additives.
 United Kingdom: 'regular' gasoline has an octane rating of 95 RON, with 97 RON fuel being widely available as the Super Unleaded. Tesco and Shell both offer 99 RON fuel. In April 2006, BP started a public trial of the super-high octane gasoline BP Ultimate Unleaded 102, which as the name suggests, has an octane rating of 102 RON. Although BP Ultimate Unleaded (with an octane rating of 97 RON) and BP Ultimate Diesel are both widely available throughout the UK, BP Ultimate Unleaded 102 was available throughout the UK in only 10 filling stations, and was priced at about two and half times more than their 97 RON fuel. In March 2010, BP stopped sales of Ultimate Unleaded 102, citing the closure of their specialty fuels manufacturing facility. Shell V-Power is also available, but in a 99 RON octane rating, and Tesco fuel stations also supply the Greenergy produced 99 RON "Momentum99".
 United States: in the US octane rating is displayed in AKI. In most areas, the standard grades are 87, 89-90 and 91-94 AKI. In the Rocky Mountain (high elevation) states, 85 AKI (90 RON) is the minimum octane, and 91 AKI (95 RON) is the maximum octane available in fuel. The reason for this is that in higher-elevation areas, a typical naturally aspirated engine draws in less air mass per cycle because of the reduced density of the atmosphere. This directly translates to less fuel and reduced absolute compression in the cylinder, therefore deterring knock. It is safe to fill a carbureted car that normally takes 87 AKI fuel at sea level with 85 AKI fuel in the mountains, but at sea level the fuel may cause damage to the engine. However, since virtually all cars produced since the 1990s have fuel injection, 85 AKI fuel is not recommended for modern automobiles and may cause damage to the engine and decreased performance. Another disadvantage to this strategy is that most turbocharged vehicles are unable to produce full power, even when using the "premium" 91 AKI fuel. In some east coast states, up to 94 AKI (98 RON) is available. As of January 2011, over 40 states and a total of over 2500 stations offer ethanol-based E-85 fuel with 94-96 AKI. Often, filling stations near US racing tracks will offer higher octane levels such as 100 AKI .
 State standard gasoline grades: U.S. State Fuel Octane Standards
 Venezuela: 91 RON and 95 RON gasoline is available nationwide, in all PDV gas stations. 95 RON gasoline is the most widely used in the country, although most cars in Venezuela would work with 91 RON gasoline. This is because gasoline prices are heavily subsidized by the government (US$0.0083 per gallon 95 RON, vs US$0.0061 per gallon 91 RON). All gasoline in Venezuela is unleaded.
 Vietnam: 92 RON is in every gas station and 95 RON is in the urban area. They start selling A92-E5 gasoline (92 RON with 5 percent of Ethanol) at 2017. On January 1, 2018, Vietnamese government forced every gas station stop selling 92 RON and sell 95 RON + A92-E5 instead. From 2022, Vietnam will start selling gasoline according to Euro 5 standards, with the choices 95 RON and 97 RON(in SFC gas stations).
 Zimbabwe: 93 octane available with no other grades of fuels available, E10 which is an ethanol blend of fuel at 10% ethanol is available the octane rating however is still to be tested and confirmed but it is assumed that its around 95 Octane. E85 available from 3 outlets with an octane rating AKI index of between 102 and 105 depending on the base gasoline the ethanol is blended with.

See also
 Avgas
 Cetane number

References

Further reading

External links
 Research Octane Number by Hydrocarbon Structure
 Gasoline Refining and Testing, Table 3.1, page 32

 Information in general
Why are Octane levels important 
 Gasoline FAQ
 How Octane Works at HowStuffWorks.com

Fuel technology
Oil refining
Petroleum economics
Scales